Seongnam is the fourth largest city in South Korea's Gyeonggi Province after Suwon and the 10th largest city in the country. Its population is approximately one million. Seongnam is a satellite city of Seoul. It is largely a residential city located immediately southeast of Seoul and belongs to the Seoul Capital Area.

Seongnam, the first planned city in Korea's history, was conceived during the era of President Park Chung-Hee for the purpose of industrializing the nation by concentrating electronic, textile, and petrochemical facilities there during the 1970s and 1980s. The city featured a network of roads, to Seoul and other major cities, from the early 1970s on. Today, Seongnam has merged with the metropolitan network of Seoul. Bundang, one of the districts in Seongnam, was developed in the 1990s.

To accelerate the dispersion of Seoul's population to its suburbs and relieve the congested Seoul metropolitan area, the Korean government has provided stimulus packages to large public corporations and private companies to be headquartered in the Bundang district. Bundang-gu is now home to prominent companies such as KT (formerly Korea Telecom).

In recent years, a movement to have Seongnam designated a metropolitan city capable of governing itself has arisen.

The city is also home to K League football club Seongnam FC.

Statistics
 Miscellaneous:

Administrative districts
Seongnam is divided into 3 "gu" (구, "ward"):
Bundang-gu
Jungwon-gu
Sujeong-gu

Economy
Nowcom has its headquarters in Bundang, Seongnam.

Pangyo Techno Valley is the premier industrial complex in Seongnam.

Sports
Seongnam FC is a professional football club that currently plays in the K League 1.

Education

The city's only international school is Korea International School - Pangyo.
Seongnam is home to the Seongnam Foreign Language High School
Seongnam is also the home to Gachon University's primary campus.

Libraries 

Sujeong Public Library
Seongnam Jungwon Library
Seongnam Gumi Library
Seongnam Bundang Library
Unjoong Library
Central Library (Seongnam)
Pangyo Library
 Jungwon Children's Library
 Haeoreum Library

Tourism and culture 
 Seongnam Arts Center

The Seongnam Arts Center includes three theaters: the opera house, concert hall, and ensemble theater.  It also includes the main arts hall and the cube arts hall, an academy, musical fountains, outdoor recreation facilities, and leisure facilities.

 Namhansanseong
 Pangyo Eco Center
 Pangyo Museum
 Bundang Central Park

Climate
Seongnam has a humid continental climate (Köppen: Dwa), but can be considered a borderline humid subtropical climate (Köppen: Cwa) using the  isotherm.

Transportation
Subway/Train
Bundang Line
Gyeonggang Line
Seoul Metropolitan Subway Line 8
Shinbundang Line
Bus
(Red Bus)
 90OO, 93OO, 94OO (OO means another number excl. 01) to Gangnam-gu or Jung-gu, Seoul
 (Green Bus)- Gyeonggi Bus
 Green bus to Seoul, Gwangju, Yongin, western Gyeonggi, National Road
 National Road number 3-Gwangju-Yatap-Sangdaewon-Seongnam IC-Gachon University Station-Seoul
Expressway
 Seoul Ring Expressway (road number 100)
 Gyeongbu Expressway (road number 1)
 Yongin-Seoul Expressway (road number 171)
 Bundang-Suseo City Road (road number 81)
 Bundang-Naegok City Road (road number 81)

Twin towns – sister cities

Seongnam is twinned with:
 Aurora, United States (1992)
 Piracicaba, Brazil (1986)
 Shenyang, China (1998)

Notable people from Seongnam
 Lee Yo-won, South Korean actress
 Lee Yeon-hee, South Korean actress and model
 Ra Yoon-chan, South Korean child actor.
 Jo Jong-hwan, member of K-pop boy group 100% and the sub-unit 100% V
 Dahyun, member of K-pop girl group Twice
 Solbin, member of K-pop girl group LABOUM
 Kino, member of K-pop boy group Pentagon
 Choi Yeon-jun, member of K-pop boy group TXT
 Jeon Hee-jin, member of K-pop girl group Loona
 Heo Chan, member of K-pop boy group Victon
 Jang Seung-yeon, member of K-pop girl group CLC
 Hong Seong-jun, member of K-pop boy group BDC
 Kim Sun-woo, member of K-pop boy group The Boyz
 Artosis, esports caster of StarCraft.
 Jimin, former member of AOA
 Yoo Jimin (Karina), member of K-pop girl group Aespa
 Lee Ga-hyeon, member of K-pop girl group Dreamcatcher

See also

KAONMEDIA manufacture and sale of digital set top boxes
List of cities in South Korea
Geography of South Korea
Seoul National Capital Area
Seongnam Central Library

References

External links

The Official Website of the Seongnam City 
The Official Website of the Seongnam City Council 

 
Cities in Gyeonggi Province